Chimur Assembly constituency is one of the 288 Vidhan Sabha (legislative assembly) constituencies of Maharashtra state, western India. This constituency is located in Chandrapur district. The delimitation of the constituency happened in 2008.

Geographical scope
The constituency comprises Chimur taluka, Nagbhir taluka and part of Brahmapuri taluka viz. revenue circle of Arher Navargaon.

Members of Legislative assembly

References

Assembly constituencies of Maharashtra